James Clancy (July 21, 1844 – January 10, 1921) was an Ontario farmer, businessman and political figure. He represented Kent West in the Legislative Assembly of Ontario from 1883 to 1894 and Bothwell in the House of Commons of Canada from 1896 to 1904 as a Conservative member.

He was born in Mosa Township, Middlesex County, Canada West in 1844, the son of Patrick Clancy, an Irish immigrant. In 1868, he married Emily McIntosh. He was a lumber merchant in Wallaceburg. Clancy served on the town council for Dresden and was reeve of Chatham. In 1896, he defeated David Mills to win a seat in the House of Commons. He ran unsuccessfully for the federal seat representing Lambton West in 1904 after the riding of Bothwell was redistributed, and for the provincial seat representing Kent West in 1905. Clancy served as provincial auditor from 1905 to 1920.

Electoral record

|}

|}

External links 

The Canadian parliamentary companion, 1891 JA Gemmill
Member's parliamentary history for the Legislative Assembly of Ontario
Lambton County's Hundred Years, 1849 - 1949, V Lauriston (1949)
Office of the Auditor General

1844 births
1921 deaths
Progressive Conservative Party of Ontario MPPs
Conservative Party of Canada (1867–1942) MPs
Members of the House of Commons of Canada from Ontario
Mayors of places in Ontario
People from Middlesex County, Ontario
People from Chatham-Kent
Canadian merchants